Burton-on-Trent Cricket Ground (exact name unknown) was a cricket ground in Burton-on-Trent, Staffordshire.  The first recorded match on the ground was in 1840, when the North played the Marylebone Cricket Club in the grounds first first-class match.  The following year the ground held its second and final first-class match when the North again played the Marlybone Cricket Club.

The final recorded match on the County Ground came in 1848 and saw Burton-on-Trent play Manchester Cricket Club.  The exact location of the ground remains unknown, although some sources such as Cricinfo believe the ground may in fact be the Town Ground.

References

External links
Burton-on-Trent Cricket Ground on CricketArchive
Burton-on-Trent Cricket Ground on Cricinfo

Defunct cricket grounds in England
Cricket grounds in Staffordshire
Sport in Burton upon Trent
Defunct sports venues in Staffordshire
Sports venues completed in 1840
1840 establishments in England